Australiasca is a genus of fungi in the family Australiascaceae.

Was formerly in the Chaetosphaeriaceae family.

References

External links

Sordariomycetes genera
Chaetosphaeriales